Hucknall station, also formerly known as Hucknall Byron station, is a railway station and tram stop in Hucknall, Nottinghamshire, England. The station has park and ride facilities, with nearly 450 parking spaces for use by both tram and train passengers.

TrentBarton Connect Red/Blue bus services connect passengers to the town centre and the western estates, stopping adjacent to the tramstop. TrentBarton 141 service connect passengers to the town centre, the eastern estate and the surrounding villages, stopping on the roadbridge above the station, or adjacent to the Tesco Extra.

The Tesco Extra and the Ashgate Retail Park (Argos, Home Bargains and Kennelgate) are located close to the station.

History
Hucknall station first opened, as Hucknall, on 2 October 1848, with the opening of the Midland Railway's line from Nottingham to Mansfield. Hucknall station was relocated to the current site on 22 December 1895, and renamed to Hucknall Byron on 11 August 1952 in order to avoid confusion with the other Hucknall stations. It was closed to passenger traffic, along with all the other stations on the line, on 12 October 1964, but the railway line itself was retained for goods traffic. On 17 May 1993, this line was reopened by British Rail to passenger traffic as part of the new Robin Hood Line, and the station was reopened under its original name, the other Hucknall stations having closed in the meantime.

The tram stop opened on 9 March 2004, along with the rest of NET's initial system.

Stationmasters

James Nutt ca. 1858 - 1861 (afterwards station master at Water Orton)
Samuel Butler 1861 - 1864 (afterwards station master at Alfreton)
J. Hey from 1864 - 1872
W.F. Foster 1872 - 1876 (afterwards station master at Alfreton)
John Clarke 1876 - 1908 (formerly station master at Rawmarsh)
Charles Chapple 1908 - 1921
T.S. Richards 1926 - 1931
E. Hallows 1931 - 1936
Albert Ernest Short 1936 - 1946 (also station master of the LNER stations in Hucknall)
J.H. Thomas from 1946

Operation

Rail
The railway has a single line and platform through the station, with the platform on the same side of the railway track as the tram stop. There is direct access from the railway platform to the tram platforms. Train services are operated by East Midlands Railway.

On Sundays, the station is served by a two-hourly service between Nottingham and Mansfield Woodhouse, with no service to Worksop. Sunday services to Worksop are due to recommence at the station during the life of the East Midlands franchise.

Tram

The tram stop has two side platforms, flanked two terminal tracks. To the south the line becomes single track as far as Butler's Hill tram stop.

With the opening of NET's phase two, Hucknall is the terminus of NET line 1, which runs through the city centre to Beeston and Chilwell. Trams run at frequencies that vary between 4 and 8 trams per hour, depending on the day and time of day.

References

Notes

External links
 

Nottingham Express Transit stops
Railway stations in Nottinghamshire
DfT Category F2 stations
Former Midland Railway stations
Railway stations in Great Britain opened in 1848
Railway stations in Great Britain closed in 1964
Beeching closures in England
Railway stations opened by British Rail
Railway stations in Great Britain opened in 1993
Railway stations served by East Midlands Railway
Reopened railway stations in Great Britain
Transport in Ashfield District